The two brothers Christoph (born July 23, 1982 in Linz) and Manuel Mitasch (born June 5, 1986 in Linz) are a world class juggling team from Austria. They are performing under the stage name Jonglissimo.

Starting in 2004 they have broken various world records in club passing, including:
 9 clubs - 1392 passes caught 
 10 clubs - 607 passes caught
 11 clubs - 237 passes caught
 12 clubs - 74 passes caught

In 2005 and 2007 they won the teams competition at the IJA Championships.

In January 2013 Christoph and Manuel participated together with Daniel Ledel and Dominik Harant as first Austrian team at Festival Mondial du Cirque de Demain in Paris.

See also
List of jugglers

External links 
 Website from Christoph and Manuel Mitasch

References 

Jugglers
Sibling duos
Living people
Year of birth missing (living people)